Mizhou Subdistrict is a subdistrict in Zhucheng, Shandong, China. It is named after the historical Mi Prefecture.

Township-level divisions of Shandong
Zhucheng